The time zones of China refer to the time zone divisions used in China between 1918 and 1949. The first time zone plan was proposed by the Central Observatory (now Beijing Ancient Observatory) of the Beiyang government in Peking (Beijing) in 1918. The proposal divided the country into five time zones: Kunlun (UTC+05:30), Sinkiang-Tibet (UTC+06:00), Kansu-Szechwan (UTC+07:00), Chungyuan (UTC+08:00) and Changpai (UTC+08:30). These time zones were ratified in 1939 by the Nationalist government in the Standard Time Conference, hosted by the Ministry of Interior of Executive Yuan. Because of the Second Sino-Japanese War, it was also stated that Kansu-Szechwan time shall be the sole national time during the war time. After the war in 1945, these five times zones were implemented national widely. In 1949, after the Chinese Civil War, the Central People's Government abolished the five time zones and announced to use a single time zone UTC+08:00 named Beijing Time. The term Chungyuan Standard Time was still used by the Government of the Republic of China on Taiwan until the early 2000s.

Overview of the time zones

Time zones and administrative divisions

See also 
 Time in China
 Time zones

Time in China